The House of Dr. Edwardes is a psychological thriller novel written by John Palmer and Hilary A. Saunders under the pseudonym Francis Beeding.

The plot concerns a psychiatrist at an asylum which is about to get a new director. The new man is attracted to Dr. Constance Sedgwick, who discovers eventually that he is not what he claims to be.

The novel was adapted to film in 1945 as Alfred Hitchcock's Spellbound.

References

External links 
 Full text of The House of Dr. Edwardes

1927 British novels
British thriller novels
Works published under a pseudonym
Hodder & Stoughton books
British novels adapted into films